The Grand Challenge Cup is a rowing competition for men's eights.  It is the oldest and best-known event at the annual Henley Royal Regatta on the River Thames at Henley-on-Thames in England.  It is open to male crews from all eligible rowing clubs. Two or more clubs may combine to make an entry.

The event dates from 1839 and was originally called the "Henley Grand Challenge Cup". The Stewards resolved that a silver cup, for which they incurred 100 guineas, was to be competed for annually by amateur crews in eight-oared boats. One of the prize medals awarded at the first race was donated to the regatta in 1969 and is on display in the Prize Tent.

The cup has since been competed for annually save for the years affected by the two World Wars and the COVID-19 pandemic. The eligibility rules have varied over the years, but the premise that the cup has always been open to all established crews has remained at its core.  Subject to rowing together long enough, F.I.S.A. national crew members may enter for this event. In its history the Cup has been won by foreign crews 47 times – 14 times by crews from Germany, 11 from the US, 9 from the former USSR, 4 times each by crews from Australia and Canada, 3 times by Belgian crews, twice by a Dutch crew and once each by crews from Bulgaria, Croatia, France and Switzerland. The Leander Club hold the record of 36 wins.

The cup itself records the names of all winning crews since 1839. The base was added in 1896 and extended in 1954 and again in 1986. The Book of Honour was added as an integral part of the trophy in 1954. In 1964, the winning Harvard crew of 1914 presented the regatta with a new cup, identical to the original of 1839, which is now very fragile. This new cup continues to be used as the trophy presented to the winning crew for lifting and photographs on finals day, with medals as in all other events being awarded permanently to winners.

The current Henley course record is  set by the winning 2018 entry.

Winners

1839–1849

1850–1899

1900–1949

1950–1999

2000 onwards

Notes and references
Notes 
  
References

Sources
 Henley Royal Regatta
 Recent Results
 Henley finals results 1839–1939
 Henley finals results 1946 onwards

1839 establishments in England
Events at Henley Royal Regatta
Rowing trophies and awards
Recurring events established in 1839